Joe Grushecky (born Pittsburgh, Pennsylvania) is a rock musician in the United States known for his work with the Iron City Houserockers in the late 1970s and early 1980s; and for his works since the late the 1980s with his act Joe Grushecky and The Houserockers; and for his solo career. After his days with the Iron City Houserockers he continued to have moderate success, mainly in the Pittsburgh area.

Biography 
In 1976, Joe Grushecky, a high school special education teacher, started the Brick Alley Band. They signed to Cleveland International Records in 1977, who rechristened them the Iron City Houserockers. The band's first album was Love's So Tough, released in 1979, and was a fair success. Their next album, Have a Good Time but Get out Alive! (released in 1980), was a bigger success. Two more albums followed, Blood on the Bricks in 1981 and Cracking Under Pressure (1983 as The Houserockers). By 1984, the band wasn't selling many records anymore and they were dropped by MCA Records. They broke up shortly thereafter.

After the breakup of the Iron City Houserockers, Grushecky returned home to Pittsburgh where he retook his teaching job (which he still holds). He also began to sharpen his songwriting. He released a single entitled "Good Bye Steeltown". Finally, in 1989, he fully re-emerged with his new act, Joe Grushecky and The Houserockers.

Grushecky's first new album since the Iron City Houserockers days was Rock & Real, released in 1989. It would be followed by seven more albums, including 1995's American Babylon, which was produced by Bruce Springsteen. Grushecky's more recent albums include Fingerprints (2002), A Good Life (2006), and East Carson Street (2009).

Discography

Albums

Iron City Houserockers 
 1979: Love's So Tough
 1980: Have a Good Time But Get Out Alive!
 1981: Blood on the Bricks
 1983: Cracking Under Pressure (The Houserockers)
 1992: Pumping Iron & Sweating Steel: The Best of the Iron City Houserockers

Joe Grushecky & The Houserockers 
 1989: Rock and Real
 1991: Swimming With the Sharks
 1994: End of the Century
 1995: American Babylon
 1997: Coming Home
 1999: Down the Road Apiece Live
 2004: True Companion
 2009: East Carson Street
 2012: We're Not Dead Yet: Live at the New Hazlett Theater
 2016: American Babylon: Live at the Stone Pony
 2017: More Yesterdays Than Tomorrows

Joe Grushecky 
 2002: Fingerprints
 2006: Outtakes and Demos 1975-2003
 2006: A Good Life
 2013: Somewhere East of Eden
 2015: It's in My Song

Singles

Iron City Houserockers
 1979: "Hideaway"
 1980: "Hypnotized"
 1980: "Junior's Bar"
 1980: "We're Not Dead Yet"
 1981: "Friday Night"

Joey G. 
 1984: "Radio Ears"/"Goodbye Steeltown"
 1985: "Stand Up"/"Victory!"

Joe Grushecky & The Houserockers 
 1989: "How Long"
 1995: "Chain Smoking"
 1995: "Labor of Love"
 1997: "Coming Home"
 2017: "That's What Makes Us Great" (With Bruce Springsteen)
 2018: "More Yesterdays Than Tomorrows"

References

External links 

Living people
American rock singers
Musicians from Pittsburgh
Singers from Pennsylvania
Year of birth missing (living people)